Svein Jarvoll (born 5 May 1946) is a Norwegian poet, novelist, short story writer, translator and essayist. He made his literary début in 1984 with the poetry collection Thanatos. He was awarded the Dobloug Prize in 2001.

References

1946 births
Living people
20th-century Norwegian poets
Norwegian male poets
20th-century Norwegian novelists
21st-century Norwegian novelists
Norwegian essayists
Norwegian translators
Norwegian male short story writers
Norwegian male novelists
Male essayists
20th-century Norwegian short story writers
21st-century Norwegian short story writers
20th-century essayists
21st-century essayists
20th-century Norwegian male writers
21st-century Norwegian male writers